Neuberg an der Mürz is a municipality in the district of Bruck-Mürzzuschlag in the Austrian state of Styria.

Geography
Neuberg lies in the upper valley of the Mürz at the foot of the Schneealpe northwest of Mürzzuschlag.

References

Cities and towns in Bruck-Mürzzuschlag District